Pseudonebularia lienardi is a species of sea snail, a marine gastropod mollusk in the family Mitridae, the miters or miter snails.

Description

Distribution
This species is occurs the Indian Ocean off the Mascarene Basin; also off New Caledonia.

References

 Dautzenberg, P. & Bouge, L.-J., 1923. Mitridés de Nouvelle-Calédonie et de ses dépendances. Journal de Conchyliologie "1922"67: 83–159
 Drivas, J. & M. Jay (1988). Coquillages de La Réunion et de l'île Maurice

External links

 Sowerby, G. B. II. (1874). Monograph of the genus Mitra. In G. B. Sowerby II (ed.), Thesaurus conchyliorum, or monographs of genera of shells. Vol. 4 (31-32): 1–46, pls 352–379. London, privately published.
 Fedosov A., Puillandre N., Herrmann M., Kantor Yu., Oliverio M., Dgebuadze P., Modica M.V. & Bouchet P. (2018). The collapse of Mitra: molecular systematics and morphology of the Mitridae (Gastropoda: Neogastropoda). Zoological Journal of the Linnean Society. 183(2): 253–337

Mitridae
Gastropods described in 1874